{{DISPLAYTITLE:C20H25NO4}}
The molecular formulas C20H25NO4 (molar mass: 343.41 g/mol) may refer to:
 Acetyldihydrocodeine
 Cilomilast, a treatment of respiratory disorders
 14-Ethoxymetopon
 6β-Naltrexol